Chamaedendron is a genus of flowering plants in the sedge family, Cyperaceae. They are endemic to New Caledonia, with 5 species formerly placed in Costularia. Its closest relatives are Costularia and Oreobolus.

List of species
 Chamaedendron kukenthaliana Larridon
 Chamaedendron fragilis (Däniker) Larridon
 Chamaedendron neocaledonica (Rendle) Larridon
 Chamaedendron nervosa (J. Raynal) Larridon
 Chamaedendron xyridioides'' (Däniker) Larridon

References

Cyperaceae
Endemic flora of New Caledonia
Cyperaceae genera